Alternaria radicina is a fungal plant pathogen infecting carrots.

References

External links

radicina
Fungal plant pathogens and diseases
Carrot diseases
Fungi described in 1922